Imiligaarjuit (ᐃᒥᓕᒑᕐᔪᐃᑦ formerly Cape Tanfield is a cape in the Qikiqtaaluk Region, Nunavut, Canada. It forms part of Baffin Island's Meta Incognita Peninsula.

References 

Landforms of Baffin Island
Nuvuttiq